The 2012 Rally de Portugal was the fourth round of the 2012 World Rally Championship season and was based in Faro, Portugal. It started with a street stage in Lisbon on 29 March and concluded on 1 April after twenty-two special stages, totalling 434 competitive kilometres.

Report

Before the rally
The rally was preceded by the "Fafe Rally Sprint", a single-stage exhibition event run over the famous Fafe stages in the country's north which was won by Ford World Rally Team driver Petter Solberg. Solberg's team-mate, Jari-Matti Latvala won the rally's qualifying stage on the Wednesday before the start of the rally. Latvala elected to run seventeenth on the road as a result; by contrast, Citroën Total World Rally Team drivers Mikko Hirvonen and Sébastien Loeb elected to run first and second respectively.

Results

Event standings

 – The WRC Academy features only the first 13 stages of the rally.

Special stages 

Notes:
 — Mikko Hirvonen won the rally, but was excluded when event scrutineers found that parts in his Citroën DS3 WRC did not match the parts listed by his team. Hirvonen's exclusion mean that Adapta World Rally Team driver Mads Østberg was declared the winner

Power Stage
The "Power stage" was a  stage at the end of the rally.

Championship standings after the event

Drivers' championship

Notes:
1 2 3 refers to the classification of the drivers on the 'Power Stage', where bonus points are awarded 3–2–1 for the fastest three drivers on the stage.

Manufacturers' championship

Notes:
† — The Mini WRC Team lost its manufacturer status in February when parent company BMW withdrew works support from the team, demoting them to customer team status. The team kept the points it scored on Rallye Monte Carlo although it was no longer classified as a manufacturer entrant. They were replaced by the WRC Team Mini Portugal as the official Mini works team.
‡ — Armindo Araújo World Rally Team and Palmeirinha Rally merged to form WRC Team Mini Portugal. The points they scored at the Rallye Monte Carlo were removed from the manufacturers' championship.

SWRC Drivers' championship

WRC Academy Drivers' Championship

Notes:
 1 refers to the number of stages won, where a bonus point is awarded per stage win.

References

Portugal
Rally de Portugal
Rally de Portugal